Shotivat Tivsuwan (born ) is a retired Thai male volleyball player. He was part of the Thailand men's national volleyball team. He won the silver medal at the 2009 Southeast Asian Games. He participated at the 2010 Asian Games.

Career
Shotivat played with the Thai club Federbrau in 2010. For the 2016, he moved to NK Fitness Samutsakhon

Clubs 
  Federbrau (2010)
  Kasetsart VC (2013–2016)
  NK Fitness Samutsakhon (2016–2017)
  Visakha (2018–)

Awards

Clubs 
 2014 Thai-Denmark Super League -  Champion, with Kasetsart VC
 2017 Thai-Denmark Super League -  Bronze medal, with NK Fitness Samutsakhon
 2018 Thai-Denmark Super League -  Runner-up, with Visakha

References

1986 births
Living people
Shotivat Tivsuwan
Volleyball players at the 2010 Asian Games
Shotivat Tivsuwan
Shotivat Tivsuwan
Shotivat Tivsuwan
Southeast Asian Games medalists in volleyball
Competitors at the 2009 Southeast Asian Games
Competitors at the 2011 Southeast Asian Games
Shotivat Tivsuwan
Shotivat Tivsuwan